Sowkarpettai is a 2016 Tamil Comedy horror film directed by Vadivudaiyan starring Srikanth and Lakshmi Rai with music composed by John Peter. The film was released only in Chennai on 4 March 2016.

Plot
When a couple is murdered by a cruel businessman, their ghosts begin to haunt the killers for revenge.

Cast

 Srikanth as Shakthi and Vetri (Dual Role)
 Raai Laxmi as Maya
 Suman as Gothra Singh
 Saravanan as Senior
 Powerstar Srinivasan as Junior
 Singampuli as Puli
 Ganja Karuppu as Saami
 Manobala as Mani
 Thalaivasal Vijay as Paramasivam (Vetri and Shakthi's father)
 Rekha as Parvathi (Vetri and Shakthi's mother)
 Vadivukkarasi as Demonness
 Meenakshi as Sanya
 Aarthi
 T. P. Gajendran
 Subbaraj
 Vengal Rao
 Madhan G
 Hresh
 Lingesh
 Rahul
 Priyanka

Production
The film was first reported in March 2015, when Vadivudaiyaan announced that he would make a film starring Srikanth and Lakshmi Rai, set in the backdrop of Sowcarpet. The film began production in March 2015, with the team suggesting that it would be a "horror comedy". This film is being made in Tamil, Telugu and Hindi languages. The film has been titled as "Siva Ganga" in Telugu and "Tantra Shakthi" in Hindi.

Music
Soundtrack was composed by John Peter and lyrics written by Viveka, (late)Na. Muthukumar and Sorkho.
"Indha Nodi" — Ranjith, Ranina Reddy
"Bhayam" — Marana Gana Viji
"Ayyo Vallikudhe" — Haricharan
"Modhi Parpene" — Ram, Saritha Ram

Reception
Vishal Menon of The Hindu called it "yet another horror-sleaze-comedy, Kollywood's latest fad, following the Aranmanai series" and also stated "it's the kind of film where even ghosts (Raai Laxmi mostly) aren't spared from being objectified". M. Suganth of Times of India gave it a 1.5/5 and wrote "For a horror film, Sowcarpettai is hardly scary. It is one of those cheaply produced, paint-by-numbers horror films that hopes to cash in on a trend, relying on tacky visual effects, an overloud score, and costumes and makeup that make the characters seem like poorly dressed guests at a Halloween party."

References

External links
 

2016 films
Indian ghost films
2010s Tamil-language films
Indian horror films
Films directed by Vadivudaiyan
2016 horror films